Beaver Creek Airport  is located  northwest of Beaver Creek, Yukon, Canada, and is operated by the Yukon government.

The airport is classified as an airport of entry by Nav Canada and is staffed by the Canada Border Services Agency (CBSA). CBSA officers at this airport can handle general aviation aircraft only, with no more than 15 passengers.

Beaver Creek Airport is the westernmost airport in Canada.

Construction 

Jack Stalberg built this airport in the 1960s. He leased the land from the government and cleared a dirt airstrip out of the bush so he could pursue his love of flying. In 2000, the community of Beaver Creek dedicated the airstrip to Stalberg, thanking him for his effort and dedication. The monument at the airport reads, "The Yukon has always been home to pioneers and people of rare vision. These words are to recognize Jack Stalberg as one such person. Through his vision, and the determination to make that vision a reality, the Beaver Creek Airport was born. Thank you, Jack. The community of Beaver Creek and the general flying public are in your debt."

References

External links
Yukon Government Airports/Aerodromes

Registered aerodromes in Yukon